Cape lilac is a common name for several plants. It may refer to:

Melia azedarach, native to China, India and Japan to Indonesia, Australia and the Pacific Islands, commonly known as "Cape Lilac" in Australia
Virgilia, native to southern Africa and cultivated as an ornamental